Ri Mi-gyong (born 30 September 1990, Kangweon province) is a North Korean table tennis player. She competed for North Korea at the 2012 Summer Olympics in the women's team event.  She competed in the same event at the 2016 Summer Olympics.

References

External links

North Korean female table tennis players
Table tennis players at the 2012 Summer Olympics
Table tennis players at the 2016 Summer Olympics
Olympic table tennis players of North Korea
1990 births
Living people
Asian Games medalists in table tennis
Table tennis players at the 2014 Asian Games
Asian Games bronze medalists for North Korea
Medalists at the 2014 Asian Games

People from Kangwon Province (North Korea)